Dale Hayes (born 1 July 1952) is a South African professional golfer.

Career outline
Hayes won the 15–17 Boys category at the Junior World Golf Championships in 1969. He turned professional the following year and quickly became a successful pro. He won more than a dozen events in South Africa, leading the South African Tour Order of Merit in 1972/73 and finishing as runner up in 1974, 1975, 1976 and 1979. In 1974 he won the World Cup of Golf for South Africa in partnership with Bobby Cole.

In 1971, Hayes won the Spanish Open at the age of 18 years and 290 days, becoming the youngest winner on the European Tour, a record which stood until Danny Lee won the 2009 Johnnie Walker Classic. By 1973 he was fourth on the European Tour Order of Merit, improving to second in 1974 and first in 1975. He played on the PGA Tour in 1976 and 1977, with a best finish of tied for second at the 1977 Florida Citrus Open. He also finished in the top four in 1978 and 1979, but played little professional golf after his late twenties.

Since he stopped playing tour golf Hayes has remained involved in the sport in a variety of ways. He has worked as a broadcaster in South Africa and for the Golf Channel, started and edited a golf magazine and helped to found an internet golf shopping business. He is involved in golf course design through a company called Matkovich & Hayes, although he deals only with marketing and public relations, while the actual design is handled by his business partner Peter Matkovic, a professional golfer with a modest playing record. Hayes also works as a public speaker and gives golf clinics.

Amateur wins
 1969 World Junior Championship (Boys 15–17), South African Amateur Stroke Play Championship, German Amateur Championship, Brazilian Amateur Championship
 1970 South African Amateur Stroke Play Championship, Scottish Amateur Stroke Play Championship

Professional wins (22)

European Tour wins (4)

European Tour playoff record (0–1)

South African Tour wins (13)
 1971 Bert Hagerman Invitational
 1973 Corlett Drive Classic, Schoeman Park Open, Rhodesian Masters, Rolux Open
 1974 Beck's PGA Championship, Holiday Inns Royal Swazi Sun Open
 1975 Beck's PGA Championship, Holiday Inns Royal Swazi Sun Open
 1976 BP South African Open Championship, Sportsman Lager PGA Championship
 1978 ICL International, Kronenbrau South African Masters

Other wins (5)
This list is incomplete.
1971 Spanish Open
1974 Coca-Cola Young Professionals' Championship, World Cup (with Bobby Cole)
1975 T.P.D. Young Professionals' Championship
1980 Columbian Open

Results in major championships

CUT = missed the half-way cut (3rd round cut in 1972 Open Championship)
"T" = tied
Note: Hayes never played in the U.S. Open or the PGA Championship.

Team appearances
Amateur
Eisenhower Trophy (representing South Africa): 1970

Professional
World Cup (representing South Africa): 1974 (winners), 1976

See also 

 Fall 1975 PGA Tour Qualifying School graduates

References

External links

Matkovich & Hayes Golf Course Architects
Hayes, Matkovich and Associates Golf Estate Development

South African male golfers
Sunshine Tour golfers
European Tour golfers
PGA Tour golfers
Sportspeople from Pretoria
1952 births
Living people
20th-century South African people